Anthony William Pidgley CBE (6 August 1947 – 26 June 2020) was an English businessman. He was the founder and chairman of Berkeley Group Holdings, one of the UK's largest housebuilding businesses. According to The Sunday Times Rich List in 2019, Pidgley was worth £335 million.

Career
Anthony Pidgley was born in 1947 in Surrey to a single mother, and then adopted from Barnardos. He spent his early life living in a disused railway carriage. He worked with his parents cutting down trees and selling the logs.

Pidgley left home in 1962 and founded a haulage business which he expanded until it had 40 lorries and then sold it to Crest Nicholson in 1968.  He then worked for Crest Nicholson for seven years. In 1976, he established Berkeley Group Holdings which he expanded until it was one of the UK's largest housebuilders. Berkeley specialises in executive style homes. He has since seen off a bid for his business from his son.

In 2016 Bloomberg referenced research from the previous year that had reported Tony Pidgley to be the second highest paid CEO of the FTSE 100 behind Martin Sorrell, with a pay packet of £23.3 million.

Honours
He was appointed a Commander of the Order of the British Empire in the 2013 New Year Honours.

Pidgley received an honorary doctorate from Heriot-Watt University in 2013.

Personal life
He married twice, most recently to Sarah Hill, and had two children by each marriage. Pidgley donated more than £2,000 to the Conservative Party. He died on 26 June 2020, after suffering a stroke.

References

1947 births
2020 deaths
People from Surrey
British businesspeople
Commanders of the Order of the British Empire
Berkeley Group Holdings people
Conservative Party (UK) donors